Monica J. Justice (nee Maxwell) is an American–Canadian developmental geneticist. She is the Canada Research Chair in Mammalian Molecular Genetics at the University of Toronto and Program Head of Genetics and Genome Biology at SickKids Hospital.

Early life and education
Justice was born in western Kansas and was raised on the family farm. Growig up, she attended Quinter High School where she was inducted into the Quinter chapter of the National Honor Society as a junior. Following high school, Justice enrolled a Fort Hays State University and began working as a medical technologist at St. Francis Hospital. She worked as a technologist for six year before returning to school for her PhD in developmental genetics. During her doctoral studies, she helped to pioneer chemical mutagenesis approaches in mice. Upon completing her PhD, Justice began a postdoctoral fellowship in the Mammalian Genetics Laboratory at the National Cancer Institute.

Career
Upon completing her fellowship, Justice was recruited by Allan Bradley to join the faculty at Baylor College of Medicine (BCM) to continue her research in developing high-throughput methods for assigning functions to mammalian genes. As a professor of molecular and human genetics at BCM, she became a co-principal investigator on a project to develop mouse models which would enable scientists to identify the function of protein-coding genes in the mammalian genome. Through a grant, Justice co-identified a mutation in a gene involved in the synthesis of cholesterol which led to the development of new treatments for Rett syndrome.

Justice eventually left BCM to become a Canada Research Chair in Mammalian Molecular Genetics at the University of Toronto and Canadian Institutes of Health Research. In this role, she was elected a Fellow of the American Association for the Advancement of Science.

Personal life
Justice married Robert A. Justice in 1978.

References

Living people
Date of birth missing (living people)
Scientists from Kansas
Canadian women geneticists
Canadian geneticists
American geneticists
Academic staff of the University of Toronto
Canada Research Chairs
Kansas State University alumni
Fort Hays State University alumni
Fellows of the American Association for the Advancement of Science
Year of birth missing (living people)